Kenneth Holland is a former American football player and coach. He served as the head football coach at Arkansas Agricultural and Mechanical College—now known as the University of Arkansas–Monticello—from 1959 to 1960, compiling a record of 5–12. As a college football player, he was the starting quarterback for the University of Arkansas during the 1946 and 1947 seasons.

Head coaching record

References

Year of birth missing (living people)
Living people
American football quarterbacks
Arkansas Razorbacks football players
Arkansas–Monticello Boll Weevils football coaches